The  is Japanese aerial lift line in Gifu, Gifu. This is the only line  operates. The company belongs to Meitetsu Group. The line, opened in 1955, climbs Mount Kinka, linking Gifu Park and Gifu Castle.

Background
In addition to taking a hiking trail up Mt. Kinka, visitors can also take the Mt. Kinka Ropeway, which first opened in 1955. This ropeway enables visitors to reach the top of the mountain in less than five minutes. The hours of operation for the ropeway vary depending on the seasons throughout the year, but it is generally open from 9:00am to 6:00pm. On weekdays, it runs every 15 minutes, while on weekends and holidays, it runs every 10 minutes.

Basic data
System: Aerial tramway, 3 cables
Distance: 
Vertical interval: 
Maximum gradient: 32°42′
Operational speed: 3.6 m/s
Passenger capacity per cabin: 46
Stations: 2
Time required for single ride: 3 minutes

Fees
{| class="wikitable"
|-
! Ropeway Fare
! One-way
! Roundtrip
|-
| Adult (over 12 y.o.)
| 600yen
| 1050yen
|-
| Child (4-11 y.o.)
| 280yen
| 520yen
|}
A 10% discount for adults and 25% for children is available for groups of 30 or more.
A 25% discount is available for adults with a school group of 30 or more.
A 50% discount is available for those on disability welfare.

See also

List of aerial lifts in Japan

References

External links
 Mt. Kinka ropeway from Gifu Convention and Visitors Bureau official website

Gifu
Tourist attractions in Gifu Prefecture
Aerial tramways in Japan
Transport in Gifu Prefecture
1955 establishments in Japan